Mohamed Ahmed is a Danish singer of Somali descent who is signed to Universal Music Denmark. He has released an EP titled Byen sover aldrig and has collaborated with a number of other Danish artists, notably  Danish singer Medina.

Discography

Albums

EPs

Singles

Featured in

References

21st-century Danish male singers
Living people
21st-century Somalian male singers
Year of birth missing (living people)